The Match Museum in Jönköping, Sweden is one of the few museums of matches in the world. It is located at the Tändsticksområdet, housed in Jönköping's first match factory. The museum highlights the people that worked in the factory and how the factory functioned.

References 

Industry museums in Sweden
Buildings and structures in Jönköping
Culture in Jönköping